A bowyer is a person who makes bows.

Bowyer may also refer to:

Places
 Bowyer Butte, Marie Byrd Land, Antarctica
 Bowyer Island, British Columbia, Canada
 Bowyer, an accepted name for Whitby, West Virginia, before 1919
 Fort Bowyer, Alabama, a US Army fortification twice fought over in the War of 1812

Other uses
 Bowyer (surname), a list of people
 Bowyers (company), a defunct producer of meat products in the UK
 Bowyer Sparke (1759–1836), English bishop
 Bowyer baronets, five baronetcies created for members of the Bowyer family

See also
 Boyer, a surname